The 1988–89 Texas Longhorns men's basketball team represented The University of Texas at Austin in intercollegiate basketball competition during the 1988–89 season. The Longhorns were led by first-year head coach Tom Penders. The team finished the season with a 25–9 overall record and finished second in Southwest Conference play with a 12–4 conference record. Texas advanced to the NCAA tournament, recording an opening round win over Georgia Tech before falling to Missouri in the second round.

Schedule and results

|-
!colspan=12 style="background:#CC5500; color:white;"| Regular season

|-
!colspan=12 style="background:#CC5500; color:white;"| Southwest Conference tournament

|-
!colspan=12 style="background:#CC5500; color:white;"| 1989 NCAA Tournament – No. 11 seed

References

Texas Longhorns men's basketball seasons
Texas
Texas
Texas Longhorns Basketball Team
Texas Longhorns Basketball Team